Stockaryd is a locality situated in Sävsjö Municipality, Jönköping County, Sweden with 958 inhabitants in 2010.

References 

Populated places in Jönköping County
Populated places in Sävsjö Municipality